Ante Over (also known as Handy Over, Eenie Einie, Auntie Over, Andy Over, Anti-Over, Annie I Over, Ante-I-over, Annie Annie Over, Annie Over, Annie Over the Shanty, Antony Over, Antny Over, Anthony Over, Andrew Over, Ankety Over, Eenie I over, Heather I Over and other regional variants)  is a children's game played in the United States and Canada, dating back to at least the mid-nineteenth century. The game requires a ball or any other small object and a barrier (usually a small gabled building) between the two teams over which the ball is thrown. It is played over a lower building that one can throw a ball over and be able to run all the way around it. The player calls out Annie-Annie Over and throws the ball over the building to the kids on the other side. If they catch the ball they can sneak around the building and throw the ball back or catch others and tag them. The players have to keep an eye open for them coming and beat them to the other side of the building. If a player makes it then that is their side but if they are tagged then they are on the other side. There can be an even number of kids on each side to start with. When there are three-four kids on a side they can split up and some go each way and then they don't know who has the ball. If the ball is not caught then they can wait a moment to try to fool the other players and then holler out Annie-Annie Over and throw the ball back. If the ball doesn't go over the building, the throwers can yell 'Pigtail!', and then try to throw it again. The ball must be caught in order to run around the building after other players. When the last kid on a team is tagged then that team wins.

Basic play 
There are two teams, one on each side of the barrier. A player on the team that starts with the ball throws the ball over the roof to the other team, yelling some version of "Ante Over" to warn them that it has been thrown. If the other team fails to catch the ball before it hits the ground, then they will yell "Ante Over" and throw it back. If the team that is thrown to catches the ball, then the player holding the ball runs around the building and tries to hit one of the members of the opposing team with the ball. Players are "safe" if they succeed in running around the building without being hit. If a player is hit, they then join the team of the player who hit them with the ball. Gameplay continues until one team has all of the players  or just one is left.

Variations 
In some areas, if the ball bounces off the wall or rolls back without going over the roof, the thrower will yell "Pig's tail", "pigtails", "Back, ball", or "Uncle" to let the other team know the ball has been thrown but did not go over. They then yell "Ante Over" again and make another attempt to throw the ball over the roof.

An indoor version of the game uses a curtain instead of a building. Any tall obstacle that obscures the other team works for the game, although a gabled roof is part of traditional play.

When a building is used instead of a fence or some other narrow object, in some variations the ball must touch the other side of the roof. Having the ball bounce this way can make it tougher for the other side to catch.  Some players even learn to finesse the ball rolling it up and over the roof.

When it is a fence, or a similar obstacle that can be seen through, it is more difficult for the players to cheat as the other side can see if the ball does or does not hit the ground.  When it is a building, or other opaque barrier, players can sometimes stealth to the other side, catching the other team by surprise.

One rule has it that the opposing player can only be hit below the waist as a safety precaution like in dodge ball.

In most versions players only have to run to the other side of the building to be "safe", while other versions require them to run all the way around the building.

References 

Ball games
Children's games
Tag variants
Outdoor games